FBC Bank , whose full name is FBC Bank Limited, is a commercial in Zimbabwe. It is licensed by the Reserve Bank of Zimbabwe, the central bank and national banking regulator.

Location
The main branch and headquarters of the bank are located on the 6th Floor of the FBC Centre, at 45 Nelson Mandela Avenue, in Harare, the capital and largest city of Zimbabwe. The geographical coordinates of this bank's headquarters are: 17°49'46.7"S, 
31°02'46.7"E (Latitude:-17.829639; Longitude:31.046306).

Overview
, FBC Bank was a medium-sized banking institution, whose total asset valuation was US$558.1 million, and shareholder's equity of US$77.9 million. The bank is very active in the digital and mobile banking arena. This has become very pertinent in the current environment, where the country has adopted a multi-currency system; using the South African Rand, the US dollar, Euro and others.

FBC Bank is a 100% subsidiary of First Banking Corporation Holdings Limited, commonly known as FBC Holdings Limited, a publicly traded financial services company whose shares are listed on the Zimbabwe Stock Exchange, under the symbol: FBCH.  The holding company owns subsidiaries, as depicted in the table below:

History
The bank was established as First Banking Corporation Limited, in 1997. In 2004, the bank was wholly acquired by FBC Holdings Limited, a diversified financial services conglomerate involved in banking, insurance, brokerage, advisory and asset management. Following the acquisition, the bank rebranded to FBC Bank Limited.

Ownership structure
The bank is a 100 percent subsidiary of FBC Holdings Limited. The investors in FBC Holdings were as listed in the table below, as of 31 December 2016.

{| style="font-size:100%;"
|-
| width="100%" align="center" | Shareholding in FBC Holdings Limited
|- valign="top" 
|

Branch network
FBC Bank maintains branches at the following locations:

 Head Office -  45 Nelson Mandela Avenue, Harare
 Samora Machel Avenue Branch - 76 Samora Machel Avenue, Harare
 Nelson Mandela Avenue Branch - 34 Nelson Mandela Avenue, Belvedere, Harare
 Msasa Branch - 104 Mutare Road, Msasa Industrial Area, Harare
 FBC Private Bank Branch - 2 Lanark Road, Belgravia, Harare
 Southerton Branch - 11 Highfields Junction Shops, Southerton, Harare
 Bulawayo Branch - 108 Jason Moyo Avenue, Bulawayo
 International Airport Branch - Harare International Airport
 Mutare Branch - 50B Herbert Chitepo Street, Mutare
 Zvishavane Branch - Robert Mugabe Way, Zvishavane
 Kwekwe Branch - Robert Mugabe Way, Kwekwe
 Beitbridge Branch - NSSA Complex, Beitbridge
 Chitungwiza Branch - 197 Tilcor Township, Seke, Chitungwiza
 Victoria Falls Branch - Shops 4&5 Galleria Complex, Victoria Falls
 Bulawayo Private Bank Branch - 2nd Floor, FBC House, 108 Jason Moyo Avenue, Bulawayo
 Graniteside Branch - 1 Crawford Graniteside Off Seke Road Harare

See also
List of banks in Zimbabwe
Reserve Bank of Zimbabwe
Economy of Zimbabwe

References

External links
 Website of FBC Bank Limited
 FBC Bank opens SME Departments
 How FBC bank is disrupting the Zimbabwean banking sector with technological ingenuity As of 5 April 2018.

Banks of Zimbabwe
Banks established in 1997
Companies based in Harare
1997 establishments in Zimbabwe